Robert Bolzon (born 19 October 1967) is a former Australian rules footballer who represented the Fitzroy Football Club in the Victorian Football League (VFL) during the 1980s.

After just the one game in 1987, Bolzon started 1988 strongly, collecting 22 disposals against St Kilda at Princess Park in round 1, however, was unable to continue this form. He played a further three games that season, before leaving the club at the end of 1988.

He later played for Prahran in the Victorian Football Association, and was runner-up for the J. J. Liston Trophy in 1991 by one vote.

References

1967 births
Living people
Fitzroy Football Club players
Prahran Football Club players
Australian rules footballers from Victoria (Australia)